KIPR (92.3 FM, "Power 92 Jams") is a commercial radio station carrying an urban contemporary format located in Little Rock, Arkansas and licensed to Pine Bluff. It is owned by Cumulus Media. The station's studios are located in West Little Rock, and the transmitter tower is located in Jefferson, northwest of Pine Bluff. Due to the transmitter location emitting 100 kilowatts, the signal covers most of Central Arkansas including places like Brinkley, North Little Rock, Conway, Gould, Fordyce and Dumas.

Station history
KIPR airs an urban contemporary format, which was launched in 1988. (Its roots can be traced back to KPWR/Los Angeles due to having KPWR's radio consultant Don Kelly serving as KIPR's programming consultant at the time). It also simulcasts on sister station KFOG at 1250 AM, although the transmitter site for this station is in College Station, Arkansas (just south of Clinton National Airport). As an urban-formatted station, KIPR's main competition comes from direct competitors KHTE-FM and Urban AC station KOKY, formerly a sister station.

KIPR's original owner was Buddy Deane, a disc jockey who worked in radio stations in the Little Rock and Memphis markets before achieving fame in Baltimore with a self-titled program that would inspire the 1988 original, Tony-award-winning musical, 2007 musical film remake, and 2016 live television special of Hairspray.

External links
Official website

IPR
Urban contemporary radio stations in the United States
Radio stations established in 1959
Cumulus Media radio stations